Gummy smile, also known as excessive gingival display, is a smile that shows an excessive amount of gum under the upper lip.  It is a common unaesthetic clinical condition, which can be caused by an abnormal dental eruption (delayed passive eruption), hyperfunction of the upper lip elevator muscle, excessive vertical growth of the maxilla bone, over-eruption of the maxillary anterior teeth, or a combination of the above described factors. Several treatment options have been proposed to enhance the smile display and to reduce the gingival exposure.

Treatment 

Treatment option include orthodontics, surgery (gingivectomy), botulinum toxin A injections, and micro-autologous fat transplantation (MAFT).

Botox is considered one of the safest and most widely used injectables. Botox (BTX-A) has been successful in the treatment of gummy smiles. Botox lip flip can last for an average of 6 months. The material is injected into the hyperactive muscles of upper lip, which causes a reduction in the upward movement of lip thus resulting in a smile with a less exposure of gingiva. Botox is usually injected in the three lip elevator muscles that converge on the lateral side of the ala of the nose; the levator labii superioris (LLS), the levator labii superioris alaeque nasi muscle (LLSAN), and the zygomaticus minor (ZMi).

References 

Dentistry